Ustad Daman (Punjabi, (born as Chiragh Deen), Punjabi), (3 September 1911 – 3 December 1984) was a Punjabi poet, writer and a mystic.
 
He was introduced into politics by Mian Iftikharuddin, a left-leaning politician, member of the Pakistan Movement and owner of Pakistan Times, a major newspaper in Lahore, Pakistan.

Life 
Ustad Daman's birth name was Chiragh Deen son of Mian Mir Baksh. He was born on 3 September 1911. Ustad Daman was introduced originally as part of the struggle for independence from British rule. A tailor by profession, in 1930, he stitched a suit for Mian Iftikharuddin, who got impressed by his inspiring poetry verse, when the two met each other at his shop. He invited Ustad Daman to recite his poem at a public meeting organized by the Indian National Congress, where Ustad Daman became an instant hit. Pandit Nehru, who was present at that public meeting, dubbed him the ‘Poet of Freedom’ after listening to his revolutionary anti-imperialist poetry. After this meeting. he became a regular participant in these meetings. 

At the time of the 1947 Partition of British India, his shop and house were burned down by rioting mobs and his wife and young daughter were killed. However, Ustad Daman decided to stay in Lahore and the newly created country of Pakistan. He then never remarried and lived the rest of his life in a small room in the 'Old Lahore'. He remained, throughout his life, a fierce opponent of dictatorship, civilian or military, and all corruption and hypocrisy. His work and poetry were published as 'Daman De Moti' after his death by his devoted followers and admirers. The poems he wrote are still widely quoted in the Punjab as well as in other regions of Pakistan.

Pakistani poet Faiz Ahmed Faiz was one of his admirers and occasionally used to visit him in Taxali Gate area of Lahore, Pakistan.

Songs in films
The following poems of Ustad Daman were used in Pakistani films:

 "Bach jaa mundia maurr taun, mein sadqey teri tore taun" Sung by Noor Jehan, lyrics by Ustad Daman and music by Feroz Nizami, film Chan Wey (1951)
 "Changa banaya aee sahnun khidona" Sung by Noor Jehan, lyrics by Ustad Daman, music by Feroz Nizami, film Chan Wey (1951)
 "Na mein sonay jai na Chandi jai mein pittal bhari paraat, meinun dharti qali kara de, mein nachhaan sari raat" Sung by Humaira Channa, lyrics by Ustad Daman, music by Kaalay Khan, a PTV, Lahore production.

Death and legacy
He died on 3 December 1984 and was buried in Madhu Lal Hussain graveyard in Lahore.

See also 
 Progressive Writers' Movement
 Habib Jalib
 Faiz Ahmed Faiz
 Munnu Bhai

References

External links 
 Ustad Daman: The People's Poet

1911 births
1984 deaths
Poets from Lahore
Pakistani Marxist writers
Pakistani Marxists
Urdu-language poets from Pakistan
Punjabi-language poets
Punjabi-language writers
Punjabi people
Pakistani activists
People from British India
Pakistani poets
20th-century poets
Pakistani songwriters
Pakistani lyricists